The Best of the Journal of the Traveller's Aid Society, Volume I is a book edited by Loren Wiseman and published by Game Designers' Workshop.

Contents
The Best of the Journal of the Traveller's Aid Society, Volume I is a compilation of selected articles from the first four issues of the Journal of the Travellers Aid Society.

Reception
William A. Barton reviewed The Best of the Journal of the Traveller's Aid Society, Volume I in The Space Gamer No. 40. Barton commented that "If you missed any issues from The Journal'''s first year, I heartily recommend The Best of the Journal of the Traveller's Aid Society, Volume I''."

See also
Journal of the Travellers Aid Society

References

Traveller (role-playing game)